Masca Gorge is a narrow valley in the north-west of the island of Tenerife. The gorge is situated within the Teno Massif. The gorge is a popular tourist destination due to its dramatic scenery and unique geology. An eight-kilometre long  walking trail begins at Masca village and continues for the length of the gorge to finish at Masca beach, approximately ten kilometres from the north-west tip of Tenerife.

Geology

Masca Gorge is found within the Teno Massif, a Miocene-age volcanic formation composed of basaltic lava flows. Much of the gorge itself is formed by steeply-dipping volcanic flows. These flows are generally less than a metre thick and mostly basaltic with scoriaceous inclusions. The flows have subsequently been intruded by several swarms of dykes, many of which form cross-cutting relationships.

A particular formation of interest is the Masca Unconformity. The unconformity consists of a polymictite breccia that varies in both thickness and dip angle depending on location. Within Masca Gorge, the breccia may be 10 – 15 metres, thick, and dip at an angle of 30 - 60 degrees to the north.

References

External links 
 Geocache hidden at Masca Gorge
 Independent travel article on walking the gorge trail
 Volcanic and geochemical evolution of the Teno Massif, Tenerife, Canary Islands: some repercussions of giant landslides on ocean island magmatism
 The growth, collapse and quiescence of Teno volcano, Tenerife: new constraints from palaeomagnetic data

Geology of Spain
Tenerife
Valleys of Spain